Johnny Buckley is a legendary Irish boxing manager and promoter from Boston, Massachusetts mostly during the first half of the 20th century who has handled some of the most famous boxers in the world including 3 World Champions.  He guided Jack Sharkey, Lou Brouillard and Paul Pender to world boxing titles.  Buckley is a member of the World Boxing Hall of Fame.

Jack Sharkey
Buckley managed Sharkey to a victories which included capturing the Heavyweight Championship of North America on September 26, 1929 by beating Tommy Loughran with a third round knockout.  Sharkey also scored an impressive fifteen round decision over Primo Carnera on October 12, 1931.  On June 21, 1932, Sharkey beat Max Schmeling with a fifteen round decision in Long Island City, New York.  The win against Schmeling allowed Sharkey to regain the National Boxing Association Heavyweight Championship of the world after losing the title initially by disqualification in the fourth round of the first fight against Schmeling two years earlier on June 12, 1930 for a low blow.

Lou Brouillard
Under Buckley, Brouillard defeated "Young" Jack Thompson on October 23, 1931 to win the World Welterweight Championship. He would go on to win the Middleweight Championship of the world with a seventh round knockout of Ben Jeby on August 9, 1933 in New York, New York.

Paul Pender
Buckley watched as Pender beat Sugar Ray Robinson twice by decision in 1960, the first earning him the Middleweight Championship of the world. He successfully defended his middleweight crown two times in 1961 against Terry Downes and Carmen Basilio before losing the title in a rematch with Downes on July 11, 1961 in London, England.  One year later he would regain the Middleweight Championship scoring a fifteen round decision over Downes in their third and final meeting on April 7, 1962.

Death
Buckley died on August 6, 1963 in St. Elizabeth's Hospital. He was 74 years old.

World Champions
 Jack Sharkey
 Lou Brouillard
 Paul Pender

References

External links
 Boxrec Boxing Encyclopedia - Johnny Buckley

Year of birth missing
1963 deaths
American boxing managers